"Du är alltid en del av mej" is a song with lyrics by Lars Berghagen and music by Lasse Holm. The song was performed by Henrik Åberg at Melodifestivalen 1996. The song's lyrics describe a person who has lost a loved one. The song has become common at funerals, since it can be interpreted that the you-person has died.

At Melodifestivalen, the song was knocked out from the first voting round, but at Svensktoppen it stayed for 36 weeks between 23 March-23 November 1996, topping the chart several times. It meant Melodifestivalen record for a Svensktoppen song, counted as 2006 contest. The record wasn't broken until 2008-2009 with Sanna Nielsen's Empty Room.

Charts

References

External links
 Information at Svensk mediedatabas

1996 singles
1996 songs
Melodifestivalen songs of 1996
Songs written by Lasse Berghagen
Songs written by Lasse Holm
Swedish-language songs
Henrik Åberg songs